Riazuddin may refer to:

Riazuddin (physicist) (1930–2013), Pakistani theoretical physicist
Riazuddin (umpire) (1958–2019), Pakistani cricket umpire
Hamza Riazuddin (born 1989), English cricketer
Riyaz Uddin (painter), Indian miniature painter
Begum Akhtar Riazuddin (born 1928)
Shaikh Riazuddin (born 1971), Indian cricketer
Riaz ud-Din (field hockey) (1942-2001), Pakistani Olympic hockey player